Molly Maxwell is a 2013 Canadian drama film directed by Sara St. Onge. It stars Lola Tash as Molly Maxwell, a teenager romantically pursuing her high school English teacher Ben (Charlie Carrick).

The film's cast also includes Krista Bridges, Richard Clarkin and Alex Ozerov.

Sarah Millman received a Canadian Screen Award nomination for Best Costume Design for her work in Molly Maxwell, at the 2nd Canadian Screen Awards in 2014.

References

External links
 

2013 films
2013 drama films
Canadian drama films
Canadian Film Centre films
English-language Canadian films
Films shot in Toronto
2010s English-language films
2010s Canadian films